Iron River is a city in Iron County in the U.S. state of Michigan. As of the 2010 census, the city population was 3,029.  The city is situated at the southeast corner of Iron River Township, but is administratively autonomous. Iron River is the birthplace and home of four-time US Olympian and 2022 gold medalist Nick Baumgartner.

History
A post office called Iron River has been in operation since 1885. The city took its name from the nearby Iron River.

On July 1, 2000, the city of Stambaugh and the village of Mineral Hills were consolidated with the City of Iron River.

Geography

The area is noted for its vast forest land, scenic lakes, and winter sports.

Iron River and the surrounding area is home of many lakes, and is not far from Lake Superior, the largest of the Great Lakes. In the summer, many people frequent the beaches, in the winter, there are often tents for ice fishing on the frozen lakes.

Demographics

2010 census
At the 2010 census there were 3,029 people, 1,446 households, and 764 families living in the city. The racial makeup of the city was 96.3% White, 0.2% African American, 1.2% Native American, 0.3% Asian, 0.1% Pacific Islander, 0.2% from other races, and 1.7% from two or more races. Hispanic or Latino of any race were 1.9%.

Of the 1,446 households, 22.5% had children under the age of 18 living with them, 36.7% were married couples living together, 12.3% had a single female householder, 3.8% had a single male householder, and 47.2% were non-families. 42.9% of households were one person, and 21.5% were one person aged 65 or older. The average household size was 2.02 and the average family size was 2.73.

The median age was 47.6 years. 19.6% of residents were under the age of 18; 6.8% were between the ages of 18 and 24; 20.4% were from 25 to 44; 28.5% were from 45 to 64; and 24.7% were 65 or older. The gender makeup of the city was 47.0% male and 53.0% female.

2000 census
At the 2000 census there were 1,929 people, 876 households, and 487 families living in the city. The racial makeup of the city was 95.33% White, 0.16% African American, 1.92% Native American, 0.21% Asian, 0.05% from other races, and 2.33% from two or more races. 0.78% of the population were Hispanic or Latino of any race. 15.4% were of German, 13.4% Swedish, 13.2% Italian, 9.9% Polish, 7.8% English, 7.6% Finnish, 5.9% French and 5.1% Irish ancestry according to Census 2000. 98.3% spoke English as their first language.
There were 876 households, 23.7% had children under the age of 18 living with them, 40.2% were married couples living together, 11.5% had a female householder with no husband present, and 44.4% were non-families. 40.3% of households were made up of individuals, and 23.7% had someone living alone who was 65 or older. The average household size was 2.09 and the average family size was 2.80.

The age distribution was 21.3% under the age of 18, 6.2% from 18 to 24, 20.8% from 25 to 44, 21.7% from 45 to 64, and 30.0% who were 65 or older. The median age was 47 years. For every 100 females, there were 81.5 males. For every 100 females age 18 and over, there were 80.2 males.

The median household income was $23,438 and the median family income was $33,942. Males had a median income of $28,083 versus $20,714 for females. The per capita income for the city was $15,728. 11.9% of the population and 6.5% of families were below the poverty line. Out of the total population, 12.5% of those under the age of 18 and 10.0% of those 65 and older were living below the poverty line.

Transportation

Roads
 courses west to Ironwood and southeast to Crystal Falls and Iron Mountain.
 travels southwest to Wisconsin.
 runs near Caspian before continuing on to Wisconsin.

Airport
Stambaugh Airport provides general aviation services to the city of Iron River and the surrounding county.

Bus
Indian Trails provides daily intercity bus service between St. Ignace and Ironwood, Michigan.

Trail
State Line Trail

Climate
This climatic region is typified by large seasonal temperature differences, with warm to hot (and often humid) summers and cold (sometimes severely cold) winters.  According to the Köppen Climate Classification system, Iron River has a humid continental climate, abbreviated "Dfb" on climate maps.

See also 
Angeli Foods

References

External links
City of Iron River

Cities in Iron County, Michigan